Ho Siu-Kee (born 1964) is a Hong Kong artist and visual art scholar. He was born in 1964 in Hong Kong. His artistic and academic research focuses on exploring bodily perceptions as a means and process of aesthetic expression.

Education 
Ho received a Bachelor of Fine Arts degree from the Department of Fine Arts, Chinese University of Hong Kong in 1989. He graduated from Cranbrook Academy of Art in 1995 with an MFA majoring in sculpture, and received his Doctorate in Fine Art from the RMIT University, Australia in 2003.

Career

Art practice
Ho's works focused on the bodily experience, using his own body to heighten his senses and spatial awareness, employing different media including sculpture, installation, photography and video. His visual presentation materializes and projects the innate personal experience as means of artistic expression which is expected to make up the communication between the 'Self' and the 'Other'.

Walking on Two Balls (1995) was a way to feel the precarious balance of the first steps, or better, and to make the viewers aware of the complexity of what looks like the very simple act of walking. The Third Eye (1996), is an ingenious device to dismount the mechanism of vision, turning obvious the hidden, unconscious process that results in the act of seeing. With Flying Machine (1995–1996), and the Sisyphus Chair (1998), the myths of Greece are revisited by Ho to show how absurd are man's attempts to go beyond the physical limits of his body. A series of works, Gravity Hoop (1997), and An Evolutionary Body (2000), illustrate in a very original way the scientific theories that explain the human body as a machine, constrained by the laws of the Universe. Sit/Stand/Lie depicts the simple and basic postures of sitting, standing and lying down. Ho claimed it was his favourite artwork, as he sees it as the critical turning point of his creative development. Quoted from the interview, Hong Kong artist Kurt Chan Yuk-keung said, "I fully understand what you mean because I can see some development in its simplicity. It is like getting some taste from drinking some pure water."

Academic career
Apart from his artistic practice, Ho is also an art educator. He worked in the School of Design at Hong Kong Polytechnic University from 1997 to 2000. In 2000, he joined the Hong Kong Arts Centre to help the establishment of its art education division namely Hong Kong Art School. Before teaching at Hong Kong Baptist University, Dr. Ho was the Academic Head of Hong Kong Art School.

Exhibitions

Solo exhibitions

Group shows

Festivals

Awards
 2012 Associate Member of the Royal Society of Sculptors.
 2015 Artist of the Year (Visual Arts), Hong Kong Arts Development Awards.

References

External links
 Artist's website
 Ocula Profile
 CFCCA Archive & Library Profile

1964 births
Living people
Cranbrook Academy of Art alumni
Hong Kong artists
Academic staff of Hong Kong Baptist University